Gothamipura Grama Niladhari Division is a Grama Niladhari Division of the Thimbirigasyaya Divisional Secretariat of Colombo District of Western Province, Sri Lanka.

Devi Balika Vidyalaya, Western Hospital, Royal Colombo Golf Club, Japanese School in Colombo, Sri Jayawardenepura Kotte, Siege of Kotte (1557–58), Kanatte Cemetery, British School in Colombo, Welikada and Nawala are located within, nearby or associated with Gothamipura.

Gothamipura is a surrounded by the Borella South, Narahenpita, Nawala West, Obesekarapura, Welikada North and Borella North Grama Niladhari Divisions.

Demographics

Ethnicity 

The Gothamipura Grama Niladhari Division has a Sinhalese majority (72.0%) and a significant Sri Lankan Tamil population (18.0%). In comparison, the Thimbirigasyaya Divisional Secretariat (which contains the Gothamipura Grama Niladhari Division) has a Sinhalese majority (52.8%), a significant Sri Lankan Tamil population (28.0%) and a significant Moor population (15.1%)

Religion 

The Gothamipura Grama Niladhari Division has a Buddhist majority (65.6%) and a significant Hindu population (13.7%). In comparison, the Thimbirigasyaya Divisional Secretariat (which contains the Gothamipura Grama Niladhari Division) has a Buddhist plurality (47.9%), a significant Hindu population (22.5%) and a significant Muslim population (17.4%)

Gallery

References 

Grama Niladhari Divisions of Thimbirigasyaya Divisional Secretariat